Kao, Lesotho is a community council located in the Butha-Buthe District of Lesotho. Its population in 2006 was 5,304.

Villages
The community of Kao includes the villages of

Ha KhokongHa LeketlaneHa LephatsoanaHa LesaoanaHa MahlekefaneHa MaphaleHa Matsoete (Boritsa)Ha RakotoaneHa Ralinko

Ha SelloHa Sepetla (Boritsa)Ha TlholoHa TomoKaoKhatlengKhohlong (Boritsa)Khohlong (Ha Rampai)Khutlo-Seaja (Ha Molema)

LehlakanengLihloahloeng (Kao)Mafiseng (Ha Rampai)MasuoanengMatebeleng (Khokong)Perekising (Boritsa)Pimville (Boritsa)Tiping

References

External links
 Google map of community villages

Populated places in Butha-Buthe District